Andreas Michalopoulos (23 February 1948 – 4 January 2022) was a Greek footballer who played as a striker for Panachaiki.

Career
He played for Panachaiki when the team qualified for the 1973–74 UEFA Cup. Before the 1973–74 UEFA Cup game against Grazer AK, an injury seemed to put an early end to his career. Michalopoulos managed to help his team some more years, but he only played 48 games in five seasons until 1979, when he officially retired.

He appeared once for the Greece national team, on 21 February 1973 against Spain. Greece lost 3–1 in the World Cup qualification match. Michalopoulos had 135 Alpha Ethniki appearances with Panachaiki and scored 30 goals. After the end of his professional career, Michalopoulos coached the Panachaiki senior team in the late 90s as well as at the beginning of the 1996–97 season. He was also the coach of the Greek junior national team.

Michalopoulos died on 4 January 2022, at the age of 73.

Managerial statistics

References

RSSSF

1948 births
2022 deaths
Footballers from Patras
Greek footballers
Association football forwards
Greece international footballers
Super League Greece players
Panachaiki F.C. players
Greek football managers
Panachaiki F.C. managers
Panserraikos F.C. managers
Panionios F.C. managers
Xanthi F.C. managers
Athlitiki Enosi Larissa F.C. managers
Proodeftiki F.C. managers
Apollon Smyrnis F.C. managers
PAS Giannina F.C. managers
Kalamata F.C. managers